Nikola Serafimov (born 11 August 1999) is a Macedonian professional footballer who plays for Fehérvár FC and the North Macedonia national team.

Club career
Serafimov, started his football career at the Vardar academy.Then he was promoted to the A team, but he could not find the chance to play. Vardar leased him to Pelister in 2017 and Bregalnica in 2018, respectively.  Returned from loan on June 30, 2019. On February 14, 2020.He terminated his contract with Vardar and parted ways. 

After staying here for a short time like 4 months, he joined Akademija Pandev from his country Macedonia teams on July 7, 2020. 

On 21 June 2021, Serafimov transferred to Hungarian team Zalaegerszegi TE.

On 11 July 2022, Serafimov joined Hungarian side Fehérvár FC for a fee of 400.000€.   Serafimov scored his first goal for Fehérvár FC in the 66th minute of their 2-1 defeat to Újpest FC on 9 November 2022.

International career
In August 2021, Serafimov received his debut call up for the senior national team in the 2022 FIFA World Cup qualification games against Armenia, Iceland and Romania.

With national team in 2022 for the Uefa Nations League tournament Bulgaria, Gibraltar and Georgia. played their matches. 

He played for national team in the friendly matches played with Finland on November 11, 2022 and Azerbaijan on November 20, 2022.

Career statistics

International

References

External links
 
 
 FDB Profile
 
 Nikola Serafimov at Fehérvár FC

1999 births
Living people
People from Skopje
Association football central defenders
Macedonian footballers
North Macedonia under-21 international footballers
North Macedonia youth international footballers
North Macedonia international footballers
FK Vardar players
FK Pelister players
FK Bregalnica Štip players
Zalaegerszegi TE players
Fehérvár FC players
Macedonian First Football League players
Nemzeti Bajnokság I players
Macedonian expatriate footballers
Expatriate footballers in Hungary
Macedonian expatriate sportspeople in Hungary